Ademipo Ibrahim Odubeko (born 21 October 2002) is an Irish professional footballer who plays as a striker for  club Port Vale, on loan from  club West Ham United.

He made his professional debut for West Ham in 2021 and has represented the Republic of Ireland on the international stage at various youth levels, although he remains eligible to play for both England and Nigeria. He spent the 2021–22 season on loan at Huddersfield Town and Doncaster Rovers, and joined Port Vale on loan for the 2022–23 campaign.

Club career

Early life and career
Odubeko was born in Dublin, Republic of Ireland to Nigerian parents and grew up in Tallaght, and he spent his formative years playing football for St Joseph's Boys. When he was fourteen years old, Odubeko and his family relocated to Manchester in England where, despite initially encountering registration concerns due to FIFA's prohibition on the international transfer of minors, he later represented both Manchester City and Manchester United at youth level. He spent the majority of his remaining schoolboy years with the latter, where he scored on his U18 Premier League debut and netted 35 times in total, before joining the academy side of fellow Premier League club West Ham United in 2019.

West Ham United

In October 2019, shortly after his seventeenth birthday, Odubeko turned down a contract extension with Manchester United in order to sign a three-year-deal with West Ham. Over the course of the next two seasons, he excelled with the club's development side and scored eleven goals in ten appearances in the Premier League 2, winning the competition's Player of the Month award in April 2021 in the process. Odubeko's form at youth level caught the attention of first team manager David Moyes during the 2020–21 season and he made two senior appearances for the campaign, making his debut as a substitute for Michail Antonio in the club's 1–0 FA Cup third round victory over Stockport County, before featuring again in the following round of the competition against his former side Manchester United. Throughout the season, he also trained regularly with the senior team and was named in the club's matchday squad on eighteen occasions throughout the Premier League campaign.

Huddersfield Town loan 
On 30 August 2021, Odubeko moved on a season-long loan to EFL Championship side Huddersfield Town, where he was given the number 7 shirt. Leigh Bromby, Huddersfield's Head of Football Operations, said that he would compete with Danny Ward, Fraizer Campbell and Josh Koroma for a first-team place in the absence of star striker Jordan Rhodes; head coach Carlos Corberán said Odubeko "offers us something different in the attacking areas". He made his debut for the club in the English Football League on 11 September, coming on as a 78th-minute substitute for Fraizer Campbell in a 2–1 defeat at Stoke City. However he found his first-team opportunities limited at the Kirklees Stadium as Huddersfield played with only one striker on the pitch and one striker on the bench. After only making six substitute appearances in the first half of the 2021–22 season, amounting to 107 minutes of playing time, West Ham activated his recall clause, and his loan was ended on 4 January 2022.

Doncaster Rovers loan 
On 27 January 2022, Odubeko joined EFL League One side Doncaster Rovers on loan for the remainder of the 2021–22 season. He scored another goal three days later in a 3–3 draw at Shrewsbury Town. He scored two goals in eight starts and eight substitute appearances for Gary McSheffrey's side, who were relegated in 22nd-place. He admitted the loan spell had been "testing" and that relegation had hurt, leaving him "sad it had to end like this".

Port Vale loan 
On 26 August 2022, Odubeko signed for League One side Port Vale on a season-long loan. Manager Darrell Clarke compared him to Kian Harratt, who had impressed on loan at the club the previous season, saying "they love to stretch the game [and] run in behind a defence". Odubeko made his debut at Vale Park four days later, and impressed coach Andy Crosby as he played the full ninety minutes against Stockport County in the EFL Trophy whilst Ellis Harrison – the club's only other available specialist striker – was rested. Odubeko scored "with a powerful downward header" on his league debut for the club in a 2–2 draw with Cheltenham Town on 3 September.

International career
Odubeko was born in the Republic of Ireland and is of Nigerian descent through his parents, who were both born in the African country. He represented the Republic of Ireland’s under-16 side in their successful 2017 Victory Shield campaign and was selected to play for the under-17 team in two matches against Finland in March 2019. However, he was overlooked for Ireland's squad for the 2019 UEFA European Under-17 Championship despite his strong form at club level and, having not represented the nation in the intervening period, rejected subsequent call-ups to the under-21 squad in 2021, sparking speculation that he could switch allegiances to Nigeria. He also remains eligible to represent England. Odubeko made his debut for the Republic of Ireland under-21 team on 29 March 2022 in a 2–0 win away to Sweden in the 2023 UEFA European Under-21 Championship qualifiers. On 3 June 2022, he scored his first goal for the under-21s in a 3–0 win over Bosnia and Herzegovina at Tallaght Stadium.

Style of play
Odubeko is a striker who boasts a prolific goalscoring record at youth level. He is predominantly right-footed but has been described as being "strong, powerful and fast" and as a player who is capable of playing on "his right and left side and who is good in the air" by former coach Bernard Byrne. This has been echoed by Republic of Ireland under-21 manager Jim Crawford who, in 2021, reflected on Odubeko as being a player who possesses "unbelievable pace, can score goals and would be an asset to any squad."

Career statistics

References

2002 births
Living people
People from Tallaght
Sportspeople from South Dublin (county)
Republic of Ireland association footballers
Republic of Ireland youth international footballers
Republic of Ireland under-21 international footballers
Black Irish sportspeople
Irish people of Nigerian descent
Irish sportspeople of African descent
Association football forwards
Crumlin United F.C. players
Manchester City F.C. players
Manchester United F.C. players
West Ham United F.C. players
Huddersfield Town A.F.C. players
Doncaster Rovers F.C. players
Port Vale F.C. players
English Football League players
Republic of Ireland expatriate association footballers
Expatriate footballers in England